Nadezhda Pavlovna Khnykina (maiden name Nadezhda Pavlovna Dvalishvili, ; born June 24, 1933) is a former Soviet track and field athlete who competed mainly in the 200 metres and long jump.

Career
Born in Baku, Azerbaijan SSR, and raised in Tbilisi, she became the youngest medallist at the Soviet Athletics Championships in 1949, coming runner-up to Yevgeniya Sechenova, the reigning 200 m European champion. Soon afterwards the teenager broke Soviet records in the 200 m and then the long jump. She won her first national title in 1951. That same year she reached the podium at the World Student Games, taking the long jump bronze medal behind fellow Soviet Aleksandra Chudina and Hungary's Olga Gyarmati.

Khnykina trained at Dynamo in Tbilisi. She competed for the Soviet Union in the 1952 Summer Olympics held in Helsinki, Finland in the 200 metres, where she won the bronze medal.  She repeated this achievement four years later in Melbourne at the 1956 Summer Olympics, only this time it was in the long jump.

The Journal of Olympic History listed her as having died in 1994, but this report was in error as the Georgian Olympic Committee celebrated her 80th birthday in 2013.

References

External links
Nadezhda Khnykina-Dvalishvili on olympicgameswinners.com

1933 births
Living people
Sportspeople from Baku
Sportspeople from Tbilisi 
Soviet female long jumpers
Soviet female sprinters
Female sprinters from Georgia (country)
Dynamo sports society athletes
Olympic bronze medalists for the Soviet Union
Athletes (track and field) at the 1952 Summer Olympics
Athletes (track and field) at the 1956 Summer Olympics
Olympic athletes of the Soviet Union
Medalists at the 1956 Summer Olympics
Medalists at the 1952 Summer Olympics
Olympic bronze medalists in athletics (track and field)
Honoured Masters of Sport of the USSR